No Place Like Home is a 1989 television film directed by Lee Grant and starring Christine Lahti and Jeff Daniels.

Cast
Christine Lahti as Zan Cooper
Jeff Daniels as Mike Cooper
Scott Marlowe as Eddie Cooper
CCH Pounder as Prue
Kathy Bates as Bonnie Cooper
Rick Aviles as J.J.

Accolades and nominations
For her performance, Lahti won the Golden Globe Award for Best Actress – Miniseries or Television Film.  Lahti was also nominated for the Primetime Emmy Award for Outstanding Lead Actress in a Limited Series or Movie.

References

External links
 

1989 television films
CBS network films
1989 films
Films about homelessness
Films directed by Lee Grant
1980s English-language films